Raymond O'Connor may refer to:

Raymond O'Connor (born 1952), American actor
Raymond O'Connor (footballer) (1913–1980), English footballer
Ray O'Connor (1926–2013), Australian politician
Remo Capitani (1927–2014), Italian actor